Hajji Kandi (also Romanized as Ḩājjī Kandī) is a village in Sarajuy-ye Jonubi Rural District, Saraju District, Maragheh County, East Azerbaijan Province, Iran. At the 2006 census, its population was 145, in 27 families.

References

External links

Towns and villages in Maragheh County